Yasmin Verheijen (born 17 February 1994) is a Dutch designer, model and beauty pageant titleholder who was crowned Miss Nederland 2014. She represented her country at the Miss Universe 2014 pageant and placed 3rd Runner-Up.

Early life 
Yasmin Verheijen is a certified interior designer originating from Amsterdam. She is an international model. She is of Indian, German, Indonesian, Chinese and Dutch descent.

Pageantry

Miss Nederland 2014 
Verheijen was crowned as Miss Nederland 2014 (Miss Universe Netherlands 2014).

Miss Universe 2014 
Verheijen represented the Netherlands at Miss Universe 2014 where she placed as 3rd runner-up to Paulina Vega of Colombia, giving the Netherlands its first placement since 2011 and its highest placement since 1992.

References

External links 
http://www.missnederland.nl

1994 births
Living people
Dutch beauty pageant winners
Dutch people of Indonesian descent
Dutch people of Indian descent
Dutch people of German descent
Miss Universe 2014 contestants
Dutch people of Chinese descent
Designers from Amsterdam
Models from Amsterdam